Metin Çekmez (26 July 1945 – 25 August 2021) was a Turkish actor.

Career
He appeared in more than 20 films since 1972, and in numerous television series, including:
Binbir Gece as Burhan Evliyaoglu
 20 Dakkika as Necmettin Solmaz
 Adini Feriha Koydum as Riza Yilmaz
Kaderimin Yazıldığı Gün as Kahraman's father, Ziya Yörükhan

Personal life and death 
Metin was the younger brother of actor Dinçer Çekmez. He died on 25 August 2021 from cancer.

Selected filmography

References

External links 

1945 births
2021 deaths
Turkish male film actors
Turkish male television actors
Turkish male stage actors
Male actors from Istanbul
Deaths from cancer in Turkey